Ledgeview is a town in Brown County in the U.S. state of Wisconsin. The population was 6,555 as of the 2010 census, up from 3,363 at the 2000 census. The unincorporated communities of Kolb and Pine Grove are located in the town.

History
The Town of Ledgeview was originally the "Town of De Pere" until the town changed the name in 1994 to end confusion with the city of De Pere.

Geography
The Town of Ledgeview is located just south of the center of Brown County. It is bordered by the city of De Pere to the west, the village of Bellevue to the north, the Town of Eaton to the east, the Town of Glenmore to the south, and the Town of Rockland to the southwest.

Demographics
As of the census of 2000, there were 3,363 people, 1,180 households, and 913 families residing in the town. The population density was 190.9 people per square mile (73.7/km2).  There were 1,214 housing units at an average density of 68.9 per square mile (26.6/km2). The racial makeup of the town was 98.69% White, 0.21% African American, 0.18% Native American, 0.39% Asian, 0.21% from other races, and 0.33% from two or more races. Hispanic or Latino of any race were 0.74% of the population.

There were 1,180 households, out of which 42.7% had children under the age of 18 living with them, 69.9% were married couples living together, 4.6% had a female householder with no husband present, and 22.6% were non-families. 17.4% of all households were made up of individuals, and 4.3% had someone living alone who was 65 years of age or older. The average household size was 2.81 and the average family size was 3.23.

In the town, the population was spread out, with 29.9% under the age of 18, 6.5% from 18 to 24, 32.9% from 25 to 44, 22.4% from 45 to 64, and 8.3% who were 65 years of age or older. The median age was 35 years. For every 100 females, there were 105.3 males. For every 100 females age 18 and over, there were 104.5 males.

The median income for a household in the town was $67,188, and the median income for a family was $75,812. Males had a median income of $46,378 versus $35,875 for females. The per capita income for the town was $31,346. About 2.3% of families and 2.9% of the population were below the poverty line, including 2.9% of those under age 18 and 9.6% of those age 65 or over.

Gallery

References

External links 
Town of Ledgeview

Towns in Brown County, Wisconsin
Green Bay metropolitan area
Towns in Wisconsin